Boucan may refer to:

Boucan, a frame for drying meat over a fire, or the dried meat itself
Boucan d'enfer, a studio album from French artist Renaud
Boucan-Carré, is a commune in the Mirebalais arrondissement in the Centre department of Haiti
Grand-Boucan, is a commune in the Baradères arrondissement in the Nippes department of Haiti